Cosse or Cossé may refer to:
Cossé-d'Anjou, France
Cossé-le-Vivien, France

People named Cosse or Cossé include:
Airbertach mac Cosse, Irish poet
Carolina Cosse, Uruguayan engineer
Emmanuelle Cosse, French politician
Laurence Cossé, French writer
Villanueva Cosse (born 1933), Uruguayan actor, theater director, and writer
Duke of Brissac

Cosse may also refer to:
Kosse (Königsberg), Prussia